With the Sri Lankan Civil War spanning nearly 30 years, (1983-2009), it has been portrayed in a wide range of ways in popular culture.

Literature

Biography
 Tamil Tigress, Niromi de Soyza, (2011)

Non fiction
 This Divided Island, Samanth Subramanian (2015)
 Island of Blood, Anita Pratap, (2003)
 The Tamil Genocide by Sri Lanka, Francis Boyle (2009)
 The Cage, Gordon Weiss (2011)
 Still Counting the Dead, Frances Harrison (2012)
 Gota’s War: The Crushing of Tamil Tiger Terrorism in Sri Lanka, C. A. Chandraprema, (2012)
 Dare to Dream - Heroic Tales for the Tamil Diaspora, JK Sivalingam (2012)
 A Fleeting moment in my country, N. Malathy,(2012)

Novels
 Tech War (Able Team), Dick Stivers (1985)
 Funny Boy, Shyam Selvadurai (1994)
 The Road from Elephant Pass, Nihal De Silva, (2003)
 Island of a Thousand Mirrors, Nayomi Munaweera, (2012)
 Dare to Dream - Heroic Tales for the Tamil Diaspora, JK Sivalingam (2012)
 The Story of a Brief Marriage, Anuk Arudpragasam (2016)

Film & TV
 Unakkaga Piranthen (1992) - Balu Anand
 Purahanda Kaluwara (1997) - Prasanna Vithanage
 Saroja (2000) - Somaratne Dissanayake
 In the Name of Buddha (2002) - Rajesh Touchriver
 Kannathil Muthamittal (2002) - Mani Ratnam
 Ira Madiyama (2003) - Prasanna Vithanage
 Aanivaer (2006) - John Mahendran
 Kuttrapathirikai (2007) - R. K. Selvamani
 Prabhakaran (2008) - Thushara Peris
 The Road from Elephant Pass (2008) - Chandran Rutnam
 Flying Fish (2011) - Sanjeewa Pushpakumara
 Matha (2011) - Boodee Keerthisena
 A Common Man (2013) - Chandran Rutnam
 Madras Cafe (2013) - John Abraham
 Ceylon (2013) - Santosh Sivan
 A Private War (2018) - Matthew Heineman

Documentaries
 Crayons and Paper - (2009) - Bruce David Janu
 Sri Lanka's Killing Fields - (2011) - Callum Macrae
 Lies Agreed Upon - (2011) - Ministry of Defence, Sri Lanka
 Sri Lanka's Killing Fields: War Crimes Unpunished - (2012) - Callum Macrae
 Ruthless - (2012) - Ministry of Defence, Sri Lanka
 No Fire Zone - (2013) - Callum Macrae
 Sri Lanka's Unfinished War - (2013) - BBC

Animation
 Mobile Suit Gundam 00 (2007) - Sunrise, Inc.

Music
 Sebalanani, (2009) - Ranidu Lankage
 Lions and Tigers, (1997) - Brown boogie nation

Video games

PSP
 Tom Clancy's Ghost Recon Predator, (2010) - Ubisoft

PC/Android
 NERO: The Sniper, (2021) - Arimac Private Limited

See also
 World War I in popular culture
 World War II in popular culture
 Culture during the Cold War

References